Amsterdam Bridge is a bridge on the waterfront in Toronto, Ontario, Canada. The steel structure is a cable footbridge that crosses over the Simcoe Street Slip from York Quay to Rees Street Slip.

Below the bridge is a docking facility for boats.

Name
The Amsterdam Bridge commemorates the twinning of Toronto and Amsterdam in 1974. Similarly, a bridge that crosses the Amstel river in Amsterdam was renamed Torontobrug. The Torontobrug is a bascule bridge built in 1970 and carries pedestrian and vehicular traffic.

A bilingual plaque mounted the bridge reads as follows:

See also

Toronto waterfront
Harbourfront Centre, Toronto
Toronto Harbour

References

Bridges in Toronto
Pedestrian bridges in Canada
Harbourfront, Toronto